David John Balcombe (born 24 December 1984) is a former English professional cricketer. Balcombe is a right-handed batsman who bowls right-arm medium-fast. He was born in the City of London and attended St. Johns School in Leatherhead.

Cricket career
Balcombe spent his early first-class career with Durham UCCE, where he played several matches against County Championship teams, his first coming against Somerset in April 2005. Despite being an expensive bowler in his early games, Balcombe occasionally hit successful patches with the ball, achieving his first five-wicket innings in July of the same year.

In the meantime, Balcombe had already represented the Surrey Second XI during 2004, though he moved to Hampshire for 2005, where he took a six-wicket haul in his first game for the Second XI. He joined Kent on a one-month loan deal in July 2011 and headed their bowling averages while he was there; there was speculation that he might join Kent but he returned to Hampshire who were relegated in his absence.

He started the 2012 season in superb form. In his first County Championship match of the season, he returned career best bowling figures of 8 wickets for 71 runs versus Gloucestershire.

In February 2016, Balcombe announced his retirement from professional cricket, having not made a first-class appearance for Surrey. He announced that he was taking up a role with the Kevin Pietersen Foundation.

References

External links

1984 births
People educated at St John's School, Leatherhead
English cricketers
Living people
Durham MCCU cricketers
Hampshire cricketers
Cricketers from Greater London
Berkshire cricketers
Kent cricketers
Surrey cricketers
British Universities cricketers